Unity for Peace and Immigration (Ahdut LeMa'an HaShalom VeHaAliya) was a short-lived one man political faction in Israel in the early 1990s.

Background
The faction was formed on 25 December 1990 when Efraim Gur broke away from the Alignment in 1990, during the term of the twelfth Knesset. Gur was invited to join Yitzhak Shamir's new government, which had been formed (minus the Alignment) on 11 June 1990, and accepted. He was initially appointed Deputy Minister of Communications, but became Deputy Minister of Transportation in November 1990.

Towards the end of the Knesset term, Gur merged his faction into Likud on 17 May 1992. Gur retained his seat in the 1992 elections on Likud's list, but broke away from his new party and saw out the remainder of his term as an independent. He formed a new party under the name Unity for the Defence of New Immigrants which ran in the 1996 elections but failed to cross the electoral threshold and subsequently disappeared.

References

External links
Unity for Peace and Immigration Knesset website

Defunct political parties in Israel
Political parties established in 1990
1990 establishments in Israel
Political parties disestablished in 1992
1992 disestablishments in Israel